Malcolm McGregor (October 13, 1892 – April 29, 1945) was an American actor of the silent era. McGregor appeared in more than 50 films between 1922 and 1936. He was born in Newark, New Jersey and died in Hollywood, California.

A cross between Wallace Reid, Rudolph Valentino, and the earlier Harrison Ford, McGregor, with slicked-back hair, starred as the young whaling captain in the 1923 film version of Ben Ames Williams' All the Brothers Were Valiant, perhaps the highlight of a busy career that mostly found the handsome, clean-cut actor supporting such glamorous female stars as Corinne Griffith, Florence Vidor, and Evelyn Brent. Like so many of his contemporaries, McGregor's career quickly waned after the changeover to sound and he was reduced to playing second fiddle to Bela Lugosi in the 1932 Mascot serial The Whispering Shadow. McGregor retired after playing a gangster in a low-budget screen version of radio's Special Agent K-7 (1937). McGregor reportedly died from burns suffered in an accident in his home in Hollywood at the age of 52.

Partial filmography

 The Prisoner of Zenda (1922) - Captain Fritz von Tarlenheim
 Broken Chains (1922) - Peter Wyndham
 All the Brothers Were Valiant (1923) - Joel Shore
 Can a Woman Love Twice? (1923) - Abner's Son
 The Untameable (1923)  - Chester Arnold
 The Dancer of the Nile (1923) - Karmet
 The Social Code (1923) - Dean Cardigan
 A Noise in Newboro (1923) - Harry Dixon
 The Bedroom Window (1924) - Frank Armstrong
 The House of Youth (1924) - Spike Blaine
 You Can't Get Away with It (1924) - Henry Adams
 Idle Tongues (1924) - Tom Stone
 Smouldering Fires (1925) - Robert Elliott
 The Girl of Gold (1925) - Schuyler Livingstone
 Lady of the Night (1925) - David Page
 Alias Mary Flynn (1925) - Tim Reagan
 The Happy Warrior (1925) - Ralph
 The Overland Limited (1925) - David Barton
 Headlines (1925) - Lawrence Emmett
 The Circle (1925) - Edward 'Teddy' Luton
 The Vanishing American (1925) - Earl Ramsdale
 Flaming Waters (1925) - Dan O'Neil
 Infatuation (1925) - Ronald Perry
 It Must Be Love (1926) - Jack Dugan
 Don Juan's Three Nights (1926) - Giulio Roberti
 The Gay Deceiver (1926) - Robert Le Rivarol
 The Silent Flyer (1926) - Lloyd Darrell, posing as Bill Smith
 Money to Burn (1926) - Dan Stone
 The Wreck (1927)
 The Price of Honor (1927) - Anthony Fielding
 The Ladybird (1927) - Duncan Spencer
 Matinee Ladies (1927) - Bob Ward
 A Million Bid (1927) - Dr. Robert Brent
 The Kid Sister (1927) - Thomas Webster
 The Girl from Gay Paree (1927) - Kenneth Ward
 Buck Privates (1928) - John Smith
 The Port of Missing Girls (1928) - Buddie Larkins
 Stormy Waters (1928) - Davis Steele
 Lingerie (1928) - Leroy Boyd
 Freedom of the Press (1928) - Bill Ballard
 Tropical Nights (1928) - Jim
 Girl on the Barge (1929) - Fogarty
 Whispering Winds (1929) - Jim
 Murder Will Out (1930) - Jack Baldwin
 The Whispering Shadow (1933) - Jack Foster
 Car 99 (1935) - Pilot at Restaurant (uncredited)
 People Will Talk (1935) - Harriet's Boy Friend (uncredited)
 China Seas (1935) - Atkins - Dock Manager (uncredited)
 Diamond Jim (1935) - Man at Racetrack (uncredited)
 Happiness C.O.D. (1935) - Jim Martin
 I'll Name the Murderer (1936) - Ted Benson 
 The Reckless Way (1936) - Don Reynolds
 Special Agent K-7 (1936) - Silky Samuels
 Undersea Kingdom (1936) - Zogg

References

External links

1892 births
1945 deaths
American male film actors
American male silent film actors
Male actors from Newark, New Jersey
20th-century American male actors
Deaths from fire in the United States
Accidental deaths in California